Prytanis (reigned from c. 865 to c. 835 BC) was king of Sparta and a member of the Eurypontid dynasty. He was succeeded by Polydectes.

References 

9th-century BC rulers
Eurypontid kings of Sparta
9th-century BC Greek people